There Is No Year is the third studio album by American experimental band Algiers. It was released through Matador Records on January 17, 2020. The album was produced by Randall Dunn and Ben Greenberg. During the lead up to the release, the band issued two non-album singles, "Can the Sub_Bass Speak?" and the Adult Swim Singles Club release of "Void". Special editions of the album include these songs as bonus tracks.

Background
The concept for the album was based around a poem, by singer Franklin James Fisher, entitled Misophonia.

Critical reception

There Is No Year has received generally positive reviews. AllMusic described the album as extending "the reach of their previous outings while offering a more strategically articulated, disciplined musicality without sacrificing their core sound or blunting their emotional impact." NME described the album's lyrics as urgent and more precise than their predecessor's. They also praised the album's diverse sound for blending post-punk, ’60s soul, gospel, disco and noise.

Track listing

Personnel
All personnel credits adapted from There Is No Year album notes.

Algiers
Franklin James Fisher 
Ryan Mahan 
Lee Tesche
Matt Tong

Vocals, guitar, bass, drums, programming, piano, synthesizers, percussion, sheet metal, prepared instruments and eight-stringed oddities

Additional musicians
Skerik – saxophone
LaToya Kent – backing vocals
Kyle Kidd – backing vocals
Lou the Dog – backing vocals

Technical
Randall Dunn – producer, mixing, additional programming, modular synth, percussion and sound design, Korg MS-20, Modal 001, Ensoniq ESQ-1
Ben Greenberg – producer, additional programming and MPC 2000
Garrett DeBlock – mixing assistant
Jason Ward – mastering
Farbod Kokabi – art direction and design

Charts

See also
List of 2020 albums

References

External links
 Page from Algiers' site

2020 albums
Algiers (band) albums
Matador Records albums
Albums produced by Randall Dunn